ISO 3166-2:CO is the entry for Colombia in ISO 3166-2, part of the ISO 3166 standard published by the International Organization for Standardization (ISO), which defines codes for the names of the principal subdivisions (e.g., provinces, states or departments) of all countries coded in ISO 3166-1.

Currently for Colombia, ISO 3166-2 codes are defined for 1 capital district and 32 departments. The capital district of Bogotá has special status equal to the departments.

Each code consists of two parts, separated by a hyphen. The second part is either of the following:
 two letters: capital district
 three letters: departments

Current codes
Subdivision names are listed as in the ISO 3166-2 standard published by the ISO 3166 Maintenance Agency (ISO 3166/MA).

Subdivision names are sorted in traditional Spanish alphabetical order: a-c, ch, d-l, ll, m-n, ñ, o-z.

Click on the button in the header to sort each column.

Changes
The following changes to the entry have been announced by the ISO 3166/MA since the first publication of ISO 3166-2 in 1998. ISO stopped issuing newsletters in 2013.

See also
 Subdivisions of Colombia
 FIPS region codes of Colombia

External links
 ISO Online Browsing Platform: CO
 Departments of Colombia, Statoids.com

2:CO
ISO 3166-2
Colombia geography-related lists